Patrick DeAngelo Cannon (born November 27, 1966) is an American politician and member of the Democratic Party who served on the City Council of Charlotte, North Carolina from 1994 through 2013 and was subsequently elected the city's 56th Mayor in November 2013. On March 26, 2014, Cannon was arrested on charges of accepting over $48,000 in bribes from undercover FBI agents posing as businessmen wanting to work with the city. Cannon resigned as mayor later that evening, and was later sentenced to 44 months in prison.

Education
Cannon received a bachelor's degree in communications with a concentration in business marketing from North Carolina A&T State University in Greensboro, North Carolina. He also holds a certification from the University of North Carolina at Chapel Hill School of Government.

Political career
Cannon was elected to the Charlotte City Council in 1993. When he was sworn in, he became the youngest council member in Charlotte history, at age 26.  Originally representing District 3 on the city's west side, he was elected to an at-large seat in 2001.  He stepped down in 2005, but was reelected in 2009.

Cannon declared his candidacy in the 2013 mayoral election after Mayor Anthony Foxx declined to run again in order to become U.S. Secretary of Transportation. On November 5, 2013, he was elected as the mayor of Charlotte with approximately 53 percent of the vote.  He was sworn in as mayor on December 2, 2013, at the Charlotte-Mecklenburg Government Center. At the time of his election as mayor, Cannon was a member of the Charlotte City Council and Mayor Pro Tempore.

Arrest on corruption charges and guilty plea

Cannon was arrested by the Federal Bureau of Investigation on public corruption charges of theft and bribery on March 26, 2014, following an FBI sting investigation that dated back to 2010, when Cannon was a member of the Charlotte City Council. He was released on bond at his initial court appearance later that day. He resigned as mayor of Charlotte shortly after his initial appearance.

On June 3, 2014, Cannon pleaded guilty to one count of honest services wire fraud, which carried a sentence of up to 20 years in prison and a $250,000 fine. He made the following public statement after pleading guilty:

It has been said that to whom much has been given much is required. For nearly half of my life, I have had the honor of serving the people of Charlotte. Much has been given to me in the way of the public's trust. I regret having acted in ways that broke that trust. For that, I am deeply sorry. I love Charlotte. It is the city of my birth. I regret having hurt the city that I love. Out of concern for the city, I immediately resigned my post as Mayor. Today, I have acknowledged being guilty of accepting monies for constituent services, something that should never have been done while serving in elected office. As I have asked of my family and friends, I also ask of you the public: your forgiveness. I understand the anger, frustration and disappointment that my actions have caused. I can only hope that the life that I live from now on will reflect both my remorse and my desire to still make a positive impact upon our city. Finally, I want to express my appreciation to my family and friends, to my legal counsel, the faith community, and to the many people whose expressions of unconditional love and support have been, and continue to be, sources of strength and encouragement.

Cannon was sentenced to 44 months in prison on October 14, 2014. He began serving his sentence at the Federal Correctional Institution, Morgantown, a minimum-security facility in West Virginia, and was originally scheduled for release on January 25, 2018.

After his conviction, Cannon voted early on October 30, 2014, while he was under house arrest. After the vote, which did not count, he told a U.S. District Judge, "I did it without thinking." On March 16, 2016, he pleaded guilty to attempted voter fraud. This did not add time to his sentence.

On September 15, 2016, Cannon was released from prison (serving 22 of the 44 months he was sentenced to.) He officially became an ex-convict on January 25, 2017, as he began two years of supervised release monitored by the Residential Re-Entry Management Office in Raleigh, NC. The RRMO is one of 25 centers around the country that oversee some 200,000 federal inmates that are transitioning back to freedom.

Attempted return to politics

On March 4, 2022, Cannon announced an attempt to return to politics by filing to run for an at-large Charlotte City Council seat. After getting his rights restored, Cannon stated that he wanted to start "a new beginning" with a chance for redemption. During the Charlotte Democratic Primaries held on May 17, 2022, Cannon finished last with just 12 percent of the Democrat vote for the at-large City Council seat.

References

External links
Official site of Mayor of Charlotte

American politicians convicted of fraud
Living people
North Carolina city council members
North Carolina Democrats
Mayors of Charlotte, North Carolina
African-American mayors in North Carolina
African-American people in North Carolina politics
North Carolina A&T State University alumni
1966 births
American politicians convicted of corruption
North Carolina politicians convicted of crimes
Charlotte, North Carolina City Council members
21st-century American politicians
21st-century African-American politicians
20th-century African-American people